Gay Village (often simply known as "the Village";  or simply Le Village) is a neighbourhood delineated by Saint Catherine Street East and Atateken Street in the Ville-Marie borough of Montreal, Quebec, Canada.

The entire Village is bordered approximately by Saint Hubert Street to the west, De Lorimier Avenue to the east, Sherbrooke Street to the north and René Lévesque Boulevard to the south, making it the largest gay village in North America in terms of area. It is served by the Beaudry and Papineau metro stations.

Originally a poor working-class area, the Centre-Sud neighbourhood became increasingly attractive to the gay and lesbian community after the migration of many LGBT businesses from other parts of the city. The area has become considerably gentrified, due in part to significant investment from the various levels of all governments. All three levels of government are aggressively promoting Montreal's gay life as a tourist attraction. In recognition of the Village's importance to the city, the Ville-Marie borough has displayed a rainbow flag in its council chambers and redecorated the entrance to the Beaudry Metro station with rainbow pillars. The Village is specifically marked on official city maps as "Le Village".

History
The first recorded gay establishment in North America was Montrealer Moise Tellier’s apple and cake shop on Craig Street (now Saint Antoine Street) in 1869.
Originally named after a little wrestler named Dave who used to wrestle outside the pubs during the summer months. 
In addition to a small scene in Old Montreal, there were traditionally two concentrations of establishments where gays were welcomed (by the 1970s, these had become openly gay businesses), which mirrored Montreal's more language-segregated culture. These were Downtown Montreal (mixed, but mostly anglophone) and The Main (mixed, but mostly francophone):

Downtown Montreal
The west end of Montreal's downtown had bars on Stanley Street and Drummond Street, with Shaughnessy Village west of Guy Street as a gay residential neighbourhood. By the 1950s, Dominion Square (now Dorchester Square) was seen as an area where men could meet and cruise and the centrally located Dominion Square Tavern was known as a place where gays could meet (it still exists today, but has lost its gay clientele). By the late 1960s and early 1970s, many gay-owned or gay-open businesses existed and it became the city's main gay concentration, though it was still relatively marginal and kept discreet. The businesses consisted mainly of clubs where men could dance.

The Main
The Main, the strip of businesses on Saint-Laurent Boulevard and east along Saint Catherine Street East, an area which was known as the Red-light district of sexual services and businesses. The east had a more francophone clientele. Here, the businesses consisted mainly of taverns, often featuring drag shows.

Closure of gay businesses in the past
The businesses in these two areas came under regular repression, particularly before Montreal's Expo 67 World's Fair and the Olympic Games in 1976. The Aquarius Sauna on Crescent Street was raided in February 1975, followed by six gay and lesbian bars in October 1975, the "Les Bains Clubs" on January 23, 1976 and the Cristal Sauna on February 11, 1976. Because of the increased police repression, the Gay Coalition Against Repression was formed and hosted what was then the largest gay demonstration in Canada on July 19, 1976. In mid-March 1987, the 456 Sauna (formerly the historical Neptune Sauna), the "Taureau d'Or", "Studio 1", "Club Stork", "le Jilly's" and many other businesses were raided and a number of owners had to shut down after dubious accusations that led to a number of owners and clients being arrested.

Development of the Gay Village
Originally, there were only a handful of establishments located in what is now the Gay Village. In the early 1980s, some bars opened along Saint-Catherine Street East, between Berri Street and Papineau Avenue, in Montreal's Centre-Sud area. Eventually, a new generation of gays also moved into the neighbourhood, both anglophone and francophone, including many came from other parts of Quebec. This was encouraged by the creation of a "Latin Quarter" in the vicinity of the Université du Québec à Montréal campus.

The name Le Village de l'Est ("the East Village") was coined in an advertisement by one of the owners of K.O.X., a very popular bar/club at the time. After having lived in New York City, it was his intention to create a strong vibrant gay community similar to the East Village in Manhattan. The name was created to differentiate itself from the traditional downtown scene. Eventually, the name became known simply as "The Village" and it became Montreal's main gay residential and commercial district. However, its success also caused the near-disappearance of gay businesses from other areas of the city.

By the 1990s, the Village began expanding along Amherst (now Atateken) Street, with the departure of many antique shops and the emergence of more gay-owned and gay-operated businesses. By this time, the Village had become well established, gaining political recognition and acceptance by the LGBT community as well as by heterosexuals. By gaining popularity, the area has generally thrived, having been beautified and having housing renovated. Almost all gay businesses in Montreal are now located in this area.

Librairie L'Androgyne, the city's main LGBT-oriented bookstore, moved to the village in 2001, from its prior location on Saint-Laurent, but closed in 2002 due to declining sales.

Although many LGBT individuals reside and are very present in other parts of Montreal, the Gay Village remains the heart of Montreal's LGBT community. Every summer, St. Catherine Street becomes a pedestrian mall that is decked out with many pink balls strung overhead. Many bars and restaurants provide outdoor terraces for their patrons at this time. Major events that are held in the Village include Fierté Montréal (Montreal's Pride festival) and Le Festival International de Montréal en Arts.

See also

List of gay villages
Montreal Pride 
Divers/Cité, Montreal's former Pride event (1993 to 2014)
2006 World Outgames
Gay Village, Toronto
Gay Village, Vancouver
Le Stud

Notes

References
Official census of the Gay Village in 2001. 

Gay villages in Canada
LGBT culture in Montreal
Neighbourhoods in Montreal
Centre-Sud
Gentrification in Canada